Independence of the Seas is a  operated by Royal Caribbean International. The 15-deck ship was built in the Aker Finnyards Turku Shipyard, Finland. At 154,407 GT, she joined Freedom of the Seas and Liberty of the Seas as the largest cruise ships and passenger vessels then built.

Independence of the Seas is the third of the Freedom-class vessels.

Areas of operation
Independence of the Seas has operated from ports in Europe and North America.

The ship was christened on April 30, 2008 during a ceremony in Southampton by its godmother, Elizabeth Hill of Chesterfield, the founder of a children's disability charity.

Facilities

Independence of the Seas facilities include an interactive water park, a dedicated water area for small children, and whirlpools which extend from the ship's sides. There is also a two-story theater, seating 1,200, an ice-skating rink and a complete conference center. On the Sports Deck, there is a rock climbing wall, the first ever trampolines at sea, a basketball/football court, water slides, and a FlowRider for surfing.

The ship underwent an extensive dry dock refurbishment in April 2018: additional cabins were added, as well as the first trampoline park at sea, laser tag, water slides and an escape room designed in collaboration with Puzzle Break.

This ship hosts the annual 70000 Tons of Metal music festival.

Incidents
On May 22, 2014, the ship was arrested by port authorities in Ålesund, Norway for nonpayment of fees. The captain notified Royal Caribbean, which transferred NOK600,000 to cover port fees in less than an hour. The ship was then allowed to depart.

Former drummer of the American rock band Boston, Sib Hashian, died on March 22, 2017, after collapsing in the middle of a set while performing on board.

On December 11, 2017, 332 of 5,547 passengers became sick with a gastrointestinal illness (believed to be norovirus-related) after the ship had departed from Port Everglades in Fort Lauderdale, Florida for a five-night Caribbean cruise. Royal Caribbean initiated a deep-cleaning of the vessel after its return to port.

References

External links

 Royal Caribbean Independence of the Seas Official site 

Ships of Royal Caribbean International
Ships built in Turku
2007 ships